Tetracha cyanides is a species of tiger beetle that was described by Henry Walter Bates in 1881.

References

Cicindelidae
Beetles described in 1881